A number of ships have been named Duchess of York, after the title or title holder of the Duchess of York, including:

Sailing ships
Duchess of York was a lugger of 12 tons (bm), two 1-pounder guns and six swivel guns, and 20 men, whose captain, Nicholas Du Frocq, received a letter of marque on 10 June 1793.
New owners in 1805 renamed her Duchess of York. Under that name she traded with the West Indies and South America until she wrecked in 1826.
 was a Spanish prize that started on a voyage as a slave ship. She was cut off on the coast of Africa in 1807 on her first slave trading voyage.

Steamships
, a South Eastern Railway passenger ferry
, a Canadian Pacific Railway ocean liner

See also

Citations

Ship names